The 12th Canadian Film Awards were held on June 3, 1960 to honour achievements in Canadian film. The ceremony was hosted by Albert Trueman, Director of the Canada Council.

Winners
Film of the Year: Not awarded
Feature Film: No entries submitted
Theatrical Short: Royal River — National Film Board of Canada, Grant McLean producer, Gordon Sparling and Roger Blais directors
Arts and Experimental: Les Bateaux de neige — Studio 7, Jacques Giraldeau director
TV Information: Bad Medicine — Crawley Films, Harry Horner and F. R. Crawley producers, Don Haldane director
Man of Kintail — Chetwynd Films, Arthur Chetwynd producer
Films for Children: Tales of the Riverbank — Riverbank Productions
The Chairmaker and the Boys — National Film Board of Canada, Tim Wilson producer
Travel and Recreation: Pressure Golf — Crawley Films, F. R. Crawley and Peter Cook producers, Peter Cook director
General Information: A Is for Architecture — National Film Board of Canada, Tom Daly and Colin Low producers, Gerald Budner and Robert Verrall directors 
Public Relations: It's the People That Count — Crawley Films, F. R. Crawley producer
Sales Promotion: Hosiery Facts and Fashions — Omega Prodctions, Richard J. Jarvis producer
Training and Instruction: An Introduction to Jet Engines — National Film Board of Canada, Frank Spiller producer, René Jodoin director
Radiation — National Film Board of Canada, Hugh O'Connor producer and director
Filmed Commercial: Duet — Robert Lawrence Productions, John Ross producer
Amateur: Paperchase — University of British Columbia, Werner Aellen director

Special Awards:
- Arthur Chetwynd, Chetwynd Films — "for dedicated service in the interest of Canadian filmmakers as an executive officer of the Association of Motion Picture Producers and Laboratories of Canada".
- Joseph Morin, Ciné-Photographic Branch, Government of Quebec — "for over forty years of service to Canadian filmmaking in the fields of production, distribution and exhibition".

References

Canadian
Canadian Film Awards (1949–1978)
1960 in Canada